Trone may refer to:

David Trone (born 1955), American businessman and politician; U.S. Representative from Maryland
Trône/Troon metro station, a Brussels metro station
Trône, a 2017 album by Booba

See also
Trones (disambiguation)